Megastomia winfriedi is a species of sea snail, a marine gastropod mollusk in the family Pyramidellidae, the pyrams and their allies.

Description
The shell size varies between 1 mm and 2 mm.

Distribution
This species occurs in the Atlantic Ocean off the Canaries and Madeira.

References

External links
 To Encyclopedia of Life
 To USNM Invertebrate Zoology Mollusca Collection
 

Pyramidellidae
Molluscs of the Atlantic Ocean
Molluscs of the Canary Islands
Molluscs of Madeira
Gastropods described in 1999